All the Earth, Thrown to the Sky is a young adult novel written by American author Joe R. Lansdale. The story takes place during the Dust Bowl in the mid-1930s.

Plot summary
It is the height of the Great Depression in the Dust Bowl of Oklahoma. Both of Jack Catcher's parents are dead. His mom died from lung disease and his father killed himself. When his neighbor Jane and her little brother Tony show up with a plan to take a dead neighbor's car to Texas, Jack is more than willing to go. However their plans go awry when they have a run in with one of the era's most notorious gangsters. They learn the gang is on their way to kill a former member. After narrowly escaping with their lives, the kids set off to warn the man that his former gang members are on their way to kill him.

Editions
This book was first issued as a hardcover by Delacorte Press and has been reissued as a trade paperback by Ember Press which is owned by Random House Publishing.

References

External links
Author's Official Website
Publisher's Official Website

Novels by Joe R. Lansdale
American mystery novels
Great Depression novels
Novels set in Texas
2011 American novels
American young adult novels
Works by Joe R. Lansdale
Delacorte Press books